Lyubomir Ivanov may refer to:

 Lyubomir Ivanov (explorer) (born 1952), scientist, non-governmental activist, and Antarctic explorer
 Lyubomir Ivanov (footballer) (born 1981), Bulgarian footballer currently playing for Montana as a midfielder
 Lyubomir Ivanov (racewalker) (born 1960), Bulgarian race walker